The Club Olympique Creusot Bourgogne, formerly known as Club Olympique Creusotin, is a French rugby union club currently playing in the 2012-13 championship of Fédérale 2 in the pool 1.

It is based in Le Creusot in the Saône-et-Loire department

Honours 
 Second division
 Finalist : 1973 (losing against  CS Bourgoin-Jallieu 6-10)
 Premier division Group B
 Finalist : 1984 (losing against CS Bourgoin-Jallieu)
 2 participations in Challenge Yves-du-Manoir
 Bourgogne Championship :
 Winner : 1926, 1930, 1939, 1941, 1944, 1945, 1946

Other competitions 
 Winner of Challenge of l'Espérance (1) : 1986.
 Finalist of Challenge Leydier in 2009
 French Champion open "touch-rugby" 2012

Notable players 
 Christian Chalmandrier, scrum half
 Gilles Delaigue, centre, international for France in 1973
 Daniel Kaczorowski, third line, international for France in 1974
 Alexandre Lapandry, growth in Le Creusot, Junior au COC, flanker in Clermont-Ferrand.
 Bernard Nectoux, centre in 1960s
 Grzegorz Kacala, third line player, international for Poland played in Grenoble, Brive and Cardiff.
 Džoni Mandić, third line centre.
 Georges Siné, wing in the 1950s
 Eddy Langi.
 Zane Bosch, South African player.
 Andrew Thompson, Munster & Irish Player
Hervé Laporte, growth in Le Creusot then played in Perpignan.
 Bernard Labouré, growth in Le Creusot then played in RC Toulon.
 André Buonomo, French Champion with Béziers in 1972
 Jean Paul Pelloux, : Finalist of French Championship 1983 with Nice against Béziers
 Gérard Verdoulet, 1/2 Finalist of French Championship with Romans against Agen in 1977.
 Sébastien kuzbik, wing of Montpellier
 Didier Rétière, now assistant coach of French National team

Coaches 
 André Buonomo 1973-1977
 Bernard Labouré 1983-1984
 Gérard Verdoulet 1984-1987
 Jean-Paul Peloux and Philippe Marguin 1991-1993
 Jean François Izidorczyk and Roch Gilot 2006-2007
 Régis Fribourg and Thierry Casasréales 2007-2010
 Wilfrid Gauthier and Sylvain Guyon 2010-2014
 Christophe Vojetta And Cedric Bourgeau 2014--

Presidents 
 Raymond Bené(1960/1966)
 Jean Bourgeois (1966/1967)
 Marcel Lagoutte (1967/1972)
 Andre Roquain (1972/1974)
 Robert Chazette (1974/1977)
 Roger Rousseau (1977/1979)
 Maurice Delorme (1979/1986)
 Jean Claude Clair (1986/1989)
 Robert Boisseau (1989/1995)
 Guy Arnoud and Claude Vernochet (1995)
 Jean Jacques Soulier (2003/2006)
 Jean Pierre Moreau and Alexandre Agnani (2007)
 Jean Pierre Moreau (2009)
 Jean Claude Bourdiau and Michel Popille (2010–present)

External links 
 Official Site
 Le Pilon en Ovalie, club of supporters

French rugby union clubs
Le Creusot